Leenesh Mattoo is an Indian television actor known for his portrayal of Rudra Singh Oberoi in Star Plus's Ishqbaaaz.

Career

Mattoo made his television debut with Star Plus's Suhani Si Ek Ladki as Anuj Birla. He next portrayed Rudra Singh Oberoi in Ishqbaaaz, his second consecutive collaboration with Star Plus.

Television

Awards and nominations

References

External links

Living people
Male actors from Mumbai
Indian male soap opera actors
Male actors in Hindi television
1992 births